Jopie van Oudtshoorn (born 5 February 1976) is a South African sprinter who specializes in the 400 metres.

His personal best time is 44.75 seconds, achieved in April 1999 in Germiston. Together with Hendrick Mokganyetsi, Adriaan Botha and Arnaud Malherbe he holds the South African record in 4 x 400 metres relay with 3:00.20 minutes, achieved at the 1999 World Championships in Seville where South Africa finished fourth. The team was subsequently awarded bronze medals for a third place in the same race, following a positive drugs test in the US team. van Oudtshoorn also ran for the South African team that finished fourth at the 2002 Commonwealth Games.

On the individual level, van Oudtshoorn won a bronze medal at the 1999 Summer Universiade in the 400 metres.

External links 
 

1976 births
Afrikaner people
Athletes (track and field) at the 2002 Commonwealth Games
Commonwealth Games competitors for South Africa
Living people
South African people of Dutch descent
South African male sprinters
World Athletics Championships medalists
Universiade medalists in athletics (track and field)
Universiade bronze medalists for South Africa
Medalists at the 1999 Summer Universiade